Vista Theatre is a historic single-screen movie theater in Los Angeles, California, located in Los Feliz on the border with East Hollywood.

History
Vista Theatre opened on October 9, 1923, as a single-screen theater. In addition to screening films, the theater also showed vaudeville acts on stage. Originally known as Lou Bard Playhouse on opening day in 1923, the cinema played the film Tips starring Baby Peggy. The original seating capacity in the auditorium held space for 838 seats. The owners later removed every other row to allow for increased legroom, reducing the number of seats to 400.

It is one of the remaining historic structures from the 1920s, when Hollywood was first built up and began attracting residents to its new suburban homes from areas near downtown Los Angeles and East Los Angeles, which, at the time, were middle and wealthy class sections of Los Angeles.

Until its refurbishment by Thomas Theaters in 1980, the theatre showed softcore pornography, then moved to hardcore porn and finally gay porn for 20 years. It also showed gay-oriented non-pornographic films, including the local premiere of The Times of Harvey Milk (1984).

The theater is a local landmark. It was renovated to play new release movies, and retains its historic architecture. The theater's forecourt features cement handprints and footprints of notable film figures.

The Vista has drawn many famous actors and directors to attend, host, or sometimes surprise audiences at screenings of their films there. Anne Hathaway, Taika Waititi, Lupita Nyong'o, John Cho, Zoë Kravitz, Chris Hemsworth, and Tessa Thompson have attended screenings of their films at the Vista since 2018.

In July 2021, director Quentin Tarantino revealed that he had purchased the theater. Tarantino plans to operate a cafe and mini screen room that will offer beer and wine.

In popular culture
The "Walls of Babylon" scenes from D. W. Griffith's film Intolerance (1916) were filmed on the site before the theater was constructed, and the completed theater first appeared in the film The Crooked Web (1955). The theater was a shooting location in 1980 for Charlie's Angels (season 4, episode 16).  In 1989, the theater appeared in Christopher Guest's comedy, The Big Picture, where it was showing the incongruent double-feature of Tess and Hardly Working. The theater later appeared in the film True Romance (1993), as the place where Clarence and Alabama first meet. The Vista also appears in the made-for-television film Return to the Batcave: The Misadventures of Adam and Burt (2003).

The Vista is pictured on the cover of Suicidal Tendencies' album Lights...Camera...Revolution! (1990). It also appears in the nighttime portions of the music video for Pharrell Williams's 2013 song "Happy", from the film Despicable Me 2.

On December 15, 2021, the Vista appeared in a new official music video for George Harrison's 1970 song "My Sweet Lord", directed by Lance Bangs and created as part of the ongoing 50th anniversary campaign for Harrison's album All Things Must Pass (1970).

External links 

 http://www.vintagecinemas.com/vista/vistacontact.html

References 

Cinemas and movie theaters in Hollywood, Los Angeles
History of Los Angeles
Movie palaces
Quentin Tarantino